Thalay Luang Stadium is a football stadium in Sukhothai Province, Thailand.  It is currently used mostly for football matches and is the home stadium of Sukhothai F.C.  The stadium holds 9,500 people.

Background
Thung Thalay Luang Stadium is approved by Asian Football Federation to host the AFC Champions League games.

After several months of improvement, the 8,000-seated Thung Thalay Luang finally matches AFC stadium criteria of AFC. Sukhothai FC will use it to host the game of AFC Champions League Preliminary Round 2 against Yadanarbon from Myanmar on 31 January 2017.

References

Football venues in Thailand
Multi-purpose stadiums in Thailand
Buildings and structures in Sukhothai province
Sport in Sukhothai province